Paradichelia fulvitacta is a species of moth of the family Tortricidae. It is found on New Guinea.

References

	

Moths described in 1953
Archipini